This is a list of the heritage sites in Kimberley as recognised by the South African Heritage Resource Agency.

|}

References 

Tourist attractions in the Northern Cape
Kimberley
Heritage sites